Lauris Strautmanis is a Latvian sport shooter. He won the bronze medal in the men's 10 metre air pistol event at the 2019 European Games held in Minsk, Belarus. He also won the silver medal in the mixed team 50 metre pistol event, alongside Agate Rašmane. In 2015, he also represented Latvia at the European Games held in Baku, Azerbaijan. He was also the flagbearer for Latvia during the opening ceremony of the 2015 European Games.

References

External links
 

Living people
Year of birth missing (living people)
Place of birth missing (living people)
Latvian male sport shooters
European Games competitors for Latvia
Shooters at the 2015 European Games
Shooters at the 2019 European Games
European Games silver medalists for Latvia
European Games bronze medalists for Latvia
European Games medalists in shooting